Abu Tarbeh (also Romanized as Abū Tarbeh; also known as Abū Taryeh and Bātarbeh) is a village in Bagh Safa Rural District, Sarchehan District, Bavanat County, Fars Province, Iran. At the 2006 census, its population was 471, in 103 families.

References 

Populated places in Sarchehan County